The Willis Avenue Station is a steam production plant used in Detroit's district steam heating system. The plant is located at 50 West Willis Street, near Woodward Avenue, in the center of the city's Midtown Detroit neighborhood. Built and owned by the Detroit Edison Company, it was listed on the National Register of Historic Places in 1997.

History
Detroit Edison was organized in 1903 to build and operate electric plants in Detroit. The Willis Avenue station was the first steam power substation used by Detroit Edison for the production of steam heat. Three other plants serve the central heating district of Detroit.

During the summer of that year, an additional  of mains were constructed, and the infrastructure was increased as the years passed. During that time, the Willis Avenue Plant was updated and altered numerous times to serve the heating needs of the community, especially between 1916-1927. The station continues to serve the Cass Farm Survey Area.

Henry Ford
This station in located near the original location of an electric generating sub-station owned and operated by the Edison Illuminating Company. It began operation in 1886. Henry Ford began his career with the Edison Illuminating Company on September 25, 1891 assigned to this substation as a Steam Engineer, working the 6:00pm to 6:00am shift.

See also 

Holly Steam Combination Company

References

National Register of Historic Places in Detroit
Energy infrastructure completed in 1916
DTE Energy
Colonial Revival architecture in Michigan
Industrial buildings and structures on the National Register of Historic Places in Michigan
Historic district contributing properties in Michigan
Energy infrastructure on the National Register of Historic Places
District heating in the United States
Industrial buildings and structures in Detroit